The European Association of Oral Medicine (EAOM) is a dental organization established in 1998 with mainly European representatives, but some non-European. It was founded by Miguel Lucas Tomás (Spain), Crispian Scully (United Kingdom), Isaac van der Waal (Netherlands), Sir David Mason, Tony Axéll (Scandinavia), Antonio Azul (Portugal), and Stephen Challacombe (United Kingdom).

List of presidents
The presidents of the EAOM have been:
 1998-2000 - Professor Isaac van der Waal, Netherlands
 2000-2002 - Professor Antonio Mano Azul, Portugal
 2002-2004 - Professor Crispian Scully CBE, UK
 2004-2006 - Professor Antonio Carrassi, Italy
 2006-2008 - Professor Peter Reichart, Germany
 2008-2010 - Professor Stephen Challacombe, UK
 2010-2012 - Professor Jose Bagan, Spain
 2012-2014 - Professor Stephen Porter, UK
 2014 - Professor Alexandra Sklavounou, Greece
 2017 - Marco Carrozzo (10th president)

References 

Dental organizations
1998 establishments in the European Union